Poco were an American country rock band from Los Angeles, California. Formed in July 1968, the group originally consisted of lead vocalist and rhythm guitarist Richie Furay, lead guitarist and vocalist Jim Messina, steel guitarist Norman "Rusty" Young, bassist Randy Meisner, and drummer and vocalist George Grantham. The band dispanded following Young's death in April 2021 – the final lineup was young alongside bassist and vocalist Jack Sundrud (1985–1987, 1990–1991, and since 2000), drummer Rick Lonow (since 2016), and guitarist and vocalist Tom Hampton (since 2020).

History

1968–1988

Poco was formed in July 1968 by Buffalo Springfield members Richie Furay, Jim Messina and session contributor Rusty Young, with former Poor bassist Randy Meisner and Young's former bandmate George Grantham completing the initial lineup. Shortly after the recording of the group's debut album Pickin' Up the Pieces in early 1969, Meisner left and was replaced by Timothy B. Schmit. A self-titled second album followed in May 1970, before Messina left in October to focus on record production. He was replaced by Paul Cotton. After three albums in three years – From the Inside (1971), A Good Feelin' to Know (1972) and Crazy Eyes (1973) – Furay left in October 1973 and the remaining members opted to continue as a four-piece. Following Furay's departure, Poco was led by Cotton and Young.

The four-piece of Cotton, Young, Schmit and Grantham remained stable for almost four years, before Schmit left to join the Eagles in September 1977, coincidentally replacing Randy Meisner again after taking over his position in Poco eight years prior. With the group taking a brief hiatus, Grantham left in January 1978, leaving Young as the sole remaining original member. Within a few months, Cotton and Young had enlisted bassist Charlie Harrison and drummer Steve Chapman to record Legend, which was released that November. The following month, the group added Kim Bullard as its first keyboardist to become a five-piece again.

After a string of releases, Bullard left Poco following the tour in promotion of 1982's Ghost Town, joining Stephen Stills' solo band in the summer of 1983. Following the release of Inamorata the following year, Bullard and bassist Harrison were replaced by Rick Seratte and Jeff Steele, respectively. By early 1985, George Grantham had returned on drums and Jack Sundrud had joined on bass. The next year, Grantham backed out again and Chapman returned in his place. Poco continued touring until the summer of 1987.

Since 1988

In late 1988, the original Poco lineup of Richie Furay, Jim Messina, Rusty Young, Randy Meisner and George Grantham reformed and recorded Legacy. After the album's 1989 release, the band returned to touring from January 1990, joined by keyboardist David Vanacore; for later shows starting in June, Furay backed out to return to his career as a church minister, with former bassist Jack Sundrud taking his place on rhythm guitar and the remaining members sharing vocal duties.

During early 1991, Poco toured as an acoustic trio featuring Messina, Young and Meisner, before Gary Mallaber joined on drums for a Japanese tour in the summer. Later in the year, Messina and Meisner left Poco again, at which point Young rebuilt the group with former lead guitarist Paul Cotton and new members Richard Neville on bass and Tim Smith on drums. This lineup remained constant for almost nine years, but did not record any new material – in early 2000, Neville and Smith were replaced by returning members Sundrud and Grantham. This lineup released Running Horse, the group's first studio album in 13 years, in November 2002.

Shortly after recording the live album Keeping the Legend Alive, Grantham was forced to temporarily stop touring with Poco after suffering a stroke; he was replaced by stand-in George Lawrence, who later became an official member of the band when Grantham was unable to return. In early 2010, Cotton was replaced by Michael Webb, who primarily focused on keyboards in the group's lineup. The new lineup released All Fired Up in 2013. In early 2016, Rick Lonow took over from Lawrence; and in October 2018, Lex Browning replaced Webb on mandolin, fiddle and guitar. By January 2020, Tom Hampton had replaced Browning in Poco.

On April 14, 2021, Rusty Young died of a heart attack. It has not yet been announced whether Poco will continue without the founding member.

Members

Current

Former

Timeline

Lineups

References

External links
Poco official website

Poco